Georges Husson, known also as Guy Husson (Toulouse, 22 November 1931-26 July 2015) was a French rugby union and league footballer, who played as wing.

Biography 
Husson started his career at rugby union for Stade Toulousain, becoming a senior player for said team. He later joined FC Lourdes, playing alongside Maurice Prat, Jean Prat and Jean Barthe.In 1954, Husson switched codes by playing rugby league, doing so by first, playing for AS Carcassonne until 1957, and then, for Albi, where he would play until the end of his playing career. With his performances at club level, Husson represented France three times in 1957, taking part at the Rugby League World Cup of that year.

After his playing career, Husson became a rugby union coach for Pamiers, Saverdun and the Stade Toulousain junior team. He later became technical director for Stade Toulousain.

Personal life 
His son, Laurent Husson, is a former rugby union player, who was French Champion with Stade Toulousain in 1985.

Honours 
Rugby league:
 Champion of the French Rugby League Championship: 1958 (Albi)
 Runner-up at the French Rugby League Championship: 1955 (Carcassonne)

References

External links 
 Guy Husson profile at rugbyleagueproject.com

1931 births
2015 deaths
Stade Toulousain players
Stade Toulousain coaches
Rugby league wingers
Rugby union wings
French rugby league players
French rugby union players
French rugby union coaches
Sportspeople from Toulouse
AS Carcassonne players
Racing Club Albi XIII players
FC Lourdes players
Rugby union players from Toulouse
France national rugby league team players